The Pique is a 33 km long river in southern France, left tributary of the Garonne. Its source is in the Pyrenees, on the north side of the Port de Venasque mountain pass. It flows generally northward, entirely within the Haute-Garonne département. It passes through the resort town Bagnères-de-Luchon and Cierp-Gaud. It flows into the Garonne in Chaum.

References

Rivers of France
Rivers of Haute-Garonne
Rivers of Occitania (administrative region)